Myrmecia queenslandica is an Australian ant species. Abundant to most states in Australia, and mainly seen in Queensland, they belong to the genus Myrmecia.

The typical length of a Myrmecia queenslandica bull ant is 11-13 millimetres. The appearance of this species is similar to Myrmecia michaelseni, and also are similar size. Most of their body is black, but pubescence on the gaster has a more yellowish colour.

References

Myrmeciinae
Hymenoptera of Australia
Insects described in 1915
Insects of Australia